The term Great Bear can refer to:

 Ursa Major, the constellation, whose name is the Latin for "Great Bear"
 Great Bear Lake, the largest lake in the Northwest Territories of Canada and the fourth largest in North America
 Great Bear River, a river fed by Great Bear Lake in the Northwest Territories of Canada
 Great Bear Rainforest, British Columbia
 Great Bear Recreation Park, a ski hill in Sioux Falls, South Dakota
 Great Bear Wilderness area in Montana
 Great Bear (band), a contra dance band
Great Bear (Radium line) a tugboat built and operated by the Radium line
 Great Bear (roller coaster), an inverted steel roller coaster at Hersheypark in Hershey, Pennsylvania
The Great Bear (film), a 2011 Danish film
The Great Bear (lithograph), artwork by Simon Patterson based on the London Tube map
The Great Bear (play), a 1951 play, never produced, by John Osborne
GWR 111 The Great Bear, a British steam locomotive

See also

 
 Great (disambiguation)
 Bear (disambiguation)